Turkestan, also spelled Turkistan (from ), is a historical region in Central Asia corresponding to the regions of Transoxiana and Xinjiang.

Overview

Known as Turan to the Persians, western Turkestan has also been known historically as Sogdia, "Ma wara'u'n-nahr" (by its Arab conquerors), and Transoxiana by western travelers. The latter two names refer to its position beyond the River Oxus when approached from the south, emphasizing Turkestan's long-standing relationship with Iran, the Persian Empires, and the Umayyad and Abbasid Caliphates.

Oghuz Turks (also known as Turkmens), Kyrgyzs, Uzbeks, Kazakhs, Khazars, Uyghurs and Hazaras are some of the Turkic inhabitants of the region who, as history progressed, have spread further into Eurasia forming such Turkic nations as Turkey, and subnational regions like Tatarstan in Russia and Crimea in Ukraine. Tajiks and Russians form sizable non-Turkic minorities.

It is subdivided into Afghan Turkestan and historical Russian Turkestan in the west, and East Turkestan.

Etymology and terminology
Of Persian origin (see -stan), the term "Turkestan" has never referred to a single nation state. Iranian geographers first used the word to describe the place of Turkic peoples. "Turkestan" is used to describe any place where Turkic peoples lived.

In 1969, a Turfanian document was found in Astana, Kazakhstan, which was given the name Documents on the Sogdian Slave Trade during the Gochang period of the Koji clan (Japanese: 麹氏高昌国時代ソグド文女奴隷売買文書) shows that in 639 the name Turkistan was used as this name of this land in Sogdian word "twrkstn"

On their way southward during the conquest of Central Asia in the 19th century, the Russians under  took the city of Turkistan (in present-day Kazakhstan) in 1864. Mistaking its name for the entire region, they adopted the name of "Turkestan" for their new territory.

History

The history of Turkestan dates back to at least the third millennium BC. Many artifacts were produced in that period, with much trade being conducted. The region was a focal point for cultural diffusion, as the Silk Road traversed it.

Turkic sagas, such as the "Ergenekon" legend, and written sources, such as the Orkhon Inscriptions, state that Turkic peoples originated in the nearby Altai Mountains, and, through nomadic settlement, started their long journey westwards. Huns conquered the area after they conquered Kashgaria in the early 2nd century BC. With the dissolution of the Huns' Empire, Chinese rulers took over Eastern Turkestan. Arab forces captured it in the 8th century. The Persian Samanid dynasty subsequently conquered it and the area experienced economic success. The entire territory was held at various times by Turkic forces, such as the Göktürks, until the conquest by Genghis Khan and the Mongols in 1220. Genghis Khan gave the territory to his son Chagatai and the area became the Chagatai Khanate. Timur took over the western portion of Turkestan in 1369, and the area became part of the Timurid Empire. The eastern portion of Turkestan was also called Moghulistan and continued to be ruled by descendants of Genghis Khan.

Chinese influence
In Chinese historiography, the Qara Khitai is most commonly called the "Western Liao" and is considered to be a legitimate Chinese dynasty, as is the case for the Liao dynasty. The history of the Qara Khitai was included in the History of Liao (one of the Twenty-Four Histories), which was compiled officially during the Yuan dynasty by Toqto'a et al.

After the fall of the Tang dynasty, various dynasties of non-Han ethnic origins gained prestige by portraying themselves as the legitimate dynasty of China. Qara Khitai monarchs used the title of "Chinese emperor", and were also called the "Khan of Chīn". The Qara Khitai used the "image of China" to legitimize their rule to the Central Asians. The Chinese emperor, together with the rulers of the Turks, Arabs, India and the Byzantine Romans, were known to Islamic writers as the world's "five great kings". Qara Khitai kept the trappings of a Chinese state, such as Chinese coins, Chinese imperial titles, the Chinese writing system, tablets, seals, and used Chinese products like porcelein, mirrors, jade and other Chinese customs. The adherence to Liao Chinese traditions has been suggested as a reason why the Qara Khitai did not convert to Islam. Despite the Chinese trappings, there were comparatively few Han Chinese among the population of the Qara Khitai. These Han Chinese had lived in Kedun during the Liao dynasty, and in 1124 migrated with the Khitans under Yelü Dashi along with other people of Kedun, such as the Bohai, Jurchen, and Mongol tribes, as well as other Khitans in addition to the Xiao consort clan.

Qara Khitai's rule over the Muslim-majority Central Asia has the effect of reinforcing the view among some Muslim writers that Central Asia was linked to China even though the Tang dynasty had lost control of the region a few hundred years ago. Marwazī wrote that Transoxiana was a former part of China, while Fakhr al-Dīn Mubārak Shāh defined China as part of "Turkestan", and the cities of Balāsāghūn and Kashghar were considered part of China.

The association of Khitai with China meant that the most enduring trace of the Khitan's power is names that are derived from it, such as Cathay, which is the medieval Latin appellation for China. Names derived from Khitai are still current in modern usage, such as the Russian, Bulgarian, Uzbek and Mongolian names for China. However, the use of the name Khitai to mean "China" or "Chinese" by Turkic speakers within China, such as the Uyghurs, is considered pejorative by the Chinese authorities, who tried to ban it.

See also
 Russian conquest of Central Asia

Notes

References

Sources

Further reading

 V.V. Barthold "Turkestan Down to the Mongol Invasion" (London) 1968 (3rd Edition)
 René Grousset L'empire des steppes (Paris) 1965
 David Christian "A History Of Russia, Central Asia, and Mongolia" (Oxford) 1998 Vol.I
 Svat Soucek "A History of Inner Asia" (Cambridge) 2000
 Vasily Bartold Работы по Исторической Географии (Moscow) 2002
 English translation: V.V. Barthold Work on Historical Geography (Moscow) 2002
 Baymirza Hayit. "Sowjetrußische Orientpolitik am Beispiel Turkestan. "Köln-Berlin: Kiepenhauer & Witsch, 1956
 Hasan Bülent Paksoy Basmachi: Turkestan National Liberation Movement
 The Arts and Crafts of Turkestan (Arts & Crafts) by Johannes Kalter.
 The Desert Road to Turkestan (Kodansha Globe) by Owen Lattimore.
 Turkestan down to the Mongol Invasion. by W. BARTHOLD.
 Turkestan and the Fate of the Russian Empire by Daniel Brower.
 Tiger of Turkestan by Nonny Hogrogian.
 Turkestan Reunion (Kodansha Globe) by Eleanor Lattimore.
 Turkestan Solo: A Journey Through Central Asia, by Ella Maillart.
 Baymirza Hayit. "Documents: Soviet Russia's Anti-Islam-Policy in Turkestan. "Düsseldorf: Gerhard von Mende, 2 vols, 1958.
 Baymirza Hayit. "Turkestan im XX Jahrhundert. "Darmstadt: Leske, 1956
 Baymirza Hayit. "Turkestan Zwischen Russland Und China. "Amsterdam: Philo Press, 1971
 Baymirza Hayit. "Some thoughts on the problem of Turkestan" Institute of Turkestan Research, 1984
 Baymirza Hayit. "Islam and Turkestan Under Russian Rule." Istanbul:Can Matbaa, 1987.
 Baymirza Hayit. "Basmatschi: Nationaler Kampf Turkestans in den Jahren 1917 bis 1934." Cologne: Dreisam-Verlag, 1993.
 Mission to Turkestan: Being the memoirs of Count K.K. Pahlen, 1908–1909 by Konstantin Konstanovich Pahlen.
 Turkestan: The Heart of Asia by Curtis.
 Tribal Rugs from Afghanistan and Turkestan by Jack Frances.
 The Heart of Asia: A History of Russian Turkestan and the Central Asian Khanates from the Earliest Times by Edward Den Ross.
 
 
 Turkestan avant-garde. Exhibition catalog. Design by Petr Maslov. M.: State Museum of Oriental Art, 2009.

 
Subdivisions of the Russian Empire
Xinjiang
Geography of Central Asia
Divided regions
Cultural regions
Historical regions